Real Crime Profile is a true crime podcast distributed by Wondery and co-hosted by Jim Clemente (former FBI profiler), Laura Richards (criminal behavioral analyst, former New Scotland Yard), and Lisa Zambetti (casting director for CBS' Criminal Minds). The show features the hosts profiling behavior from real criminal cases from Charles Manson, to John Meehan of the podcast Dirty John to Jerry Sandusky.

In 2018, Real Crime Profile partnered with Showtime to create Escape At Dannemora, a companion podcast series to launch alongside the television show of the same name (Escape At Dannemora). This successful 8-episode limited series podcast was nominated for Best Branded Podcast in the 2019 Shorty Awards.

Episodes

See also 
 List of American crime podcasts

References

External links 
 
  on Wondery

Infotainment
Audio podcasts
2016 podcast debuts
Crime podcasts
American podcasts